Tephritis vespertina is a species of tephritid or fruit flies in the genus Tephritis of the family Tephritidae. The larvae feed on Picris echioides.

Distribution
Europe, except Sweden & Finland, South to North Africa.

References

Tephritinae
Insects described in 1844
Diptera of Africa
Diptera of Europe